Yuriy Protasov (born April 23, 1984, in the Ukrainian SSR, Soviet Union) is a rally driver from Ukraine. He won the Ukrainian Rally Championship in 2008. In 2011, Protasov contested in the Production World Rally Championship (PWRC) with the Darnitsa Motorsport driving a Mitsubishi Lancer Evo X.

Career

Karting
Yuriy Protasov began his motorsport career in 1994 under the guidance of his father, a famous Ukrainian driver Leonid Protasov. In the second season he won the Ukrainian Karting Championship in the class "Pioneer-A" (1995). This was followed by a similar victories in the Ukrainian Karting Championship 1996 (class "Pioneer-B"), 1997 (classes "Popular-Junior" and "ICA-Junior") and 1998 (Class "Popular-Junior"), as well as "bronze" in the Ukrainian Karting Championship in 1998 in the class "ICA-Junior."

The latest achievement of Yuriy in karting was the "bronze" in the International karting race "Chaika-2001" (class «ICA»).

Circuit racing
After the end of the active performances in karting Protasov tried his hand at circuit racing, performing in 2000 in Formula Ford serie (cars up to 1998 year). By the end of the season, Yuriy took 14th place in the overall classification of the series and won the bronze medal in its class.

In 2003, Yuriy Protasov took part in the Ukrainian Circuit Championship (class A9) and took second place. A year later, the pilot took part in a test drive of the Formula Renault 2000 Germany, but then decided to concentrate on his rallying career.

Rally

Ukrainian Rally Championship
Yuriy Protasov's rallying career started in 1999 with performances as a co-driver (navigator) along with his father, Leonid Protasov. Their first race brought success to the family tandem – victory in the first round of the Ukrainian Rally Championship, rally "Stolitsa" (Lada Samara, A9 class). Starting from the next race crew changed Lada on Ford Escort RS 2000, but in the remaining races of the season they never again manage to finish. For some time, Yuriy switches attention to circuit races, but in 2002 returned to the rally already as a driver. Since then, the only exception was the rally "Moldova" 2007, where Yuriy was a navigator in the crew of his friend Yuri Yanovsky.

First Yuriy's steps as a professional rally driver was helped by his family friend, businessman and motor sport enthusiast Taras Chernukha who becomes the co-driver of the crew for the next four seasons. During this period, the crew mastered the discipline systematically changing cars. Another Lada Samara (season 2002) was again replaced by Ford Escort RS 2000 (2003), followed by Mitsubishi Lancer Evolution (2004), and finally, Subaru Impreza (2005). Exactly on this car crew achieves the greatest success in their joint career, winning the overall classification in prestigious Life Yalta Rally. In fact, it becomes an extreme point of joint performances of Protasov and Chernukha – at the end of 2005 Taras retired as a navigator.

In search of a new partner Yuriy refers to Alexander Skochik, and they – without much success – hold Ukrainian Rally Championship 2006. However, for the continuation of a serious career, Protasov need the more professional co-driver – and he invites Alexander Gorbik, former navigator of Yuriy's main rival, Olexandr Saliuk Jr. In a bitter struggle Protasov firstly gains bronze medals of the Ukrainian Rally Championship in 2007, and then becomes the absolute champion of Ukraine in 2008.

At the same time close cooperation between Protasov and Ace Racing team begins, which later transformed into the Darnitsa Motorsport team. The squad set the extremely high goals, so after winning the national championship Yuriy decreases his appearance in Ukrainian rallies. From 2009 to 2014, he started only three times at home, fully devoting all his attention to performances on the international competitions.

European Rally Championship
The next step in the Protasov's career is European Rally Championship, where he made his debut in June 2008 at a Rajd Polski. After spending a few races with the Ukrainian Kirill Nesvit and Pole Lukasz Wronski, Protasov returns to collaboration with Adrian Aftanaziv. After overcoming a series of failures and retirements from the road, the crew seeks the first major international victory, winning the Greek Rally Elpa 2010. The result of the season was 51 points and 10th place in the overall classification of the European Championship.

World Rally Championship
Till 2011, Yuri Protasov – the constant participant of the World Rally Championship. The 2011 season could be called a warm up (crew Protasov – Aftanaziv spent only three races, while rising to the podium in Sweden). But in the 2012 Protasov, again co-working with Kyrylo Nesvit, involves in a serious fight for the Subaru Trophy established by the Belgian team Symtech Racing. Prize for winning the trophy, which Protasov gains, was the five rounds of the WRC 2013 on the Subaru Impreza fully paid by Symtech.

Obtained the gained right in the first five rounds of the championship, Yuriy Protasov and his new co-driver, Estonian Kuldar Sikk, change to a more powerful cars – Ford Fiesta RRC and the Ford Fiesta R5. Smart tactics and successful strategy allow the crew to perform well in the WRC 2 and, climbing the podium in three of the seven scoring events, to win the "bronze" of the world championship.

2014 Protasov begins with a new co-driver – now it's Ukrainian Pavlo Cherepin. Brilliant victories in the Monte Carlo Rally and the Rally Mexico, combined with confident performances in Sweden and Italy, allow the crew to get the top three in the WRC 2 in one round until the end of the season. But at the final round in Wales two rivals, Nasser Al-Attiyah and Jari Ketomaa moved Yuriy to 4th place.

2015 WRC season starts for Protasov and Cherepin with the brand new car – Citroen DS3 WRC prepared by D-Max Racing. Debut race goes not the best way and after that crew changes car back to Ford Fiesta RS WRC. The second WRC round in Sweden becomes historical for Protasov: setting the best time overall on special stage 6, he becomes the first Ukrainian driver able to make it.

On the next rounds of Championship in Mexico and Argentina Protasov and Cherepin return to Ford Fiesta RRC. Both times heading the WRC 2, the crew managed only to finish outside top-three due to technical problems (engine overheating in Mexico and broken suspension in Argentina). The luck came back in Italy where the crew finally won the WRC 2 round with famous Paolo Andreucci second and Jan Kopecky third. Spirited by this result, Yuriy became 3rd in Finland and Germany and 2nd in Australia, getting the record-breaking for him four podiums in row.

Career results

WRC results

PWRC results

† Excluded from Championship

WRC-2 results

WRC-3 results

Podiums

Interesting facts
Yuriy Protasov is the first Ukrainian driver to have won a WRC special stage when he finished fastest on SS6 of 2015 Rally Sweden.

Three navigators of Yuriy Protasov – Olexandr Gorbik, Adrian Aftanaziv and Pavlo Cherepin – started their rallying careers as the co-drivers of Protasov's main rival, Oleksandr Saliuk.

References

External links
 

1984 births
Living people
Sportspeople from Kyiv
Ukrainian racing drivers
Ukrainian rally drivers
Formula Ford drivers
World Rally Championship drivers
European Touring Car Cup drivers
European Rally Championship drivers
M-Sport drivers